The Seal of Dartmouth College is the official insignia of Dartmouth College, an Ivy League university located in Hanover, New Hampshire, United States. Anglo-American law generally requires a corporate body to seek official government sanction, usually in the form of a charter, in order to operate. Such chartered bodies normally authenticate their official acts by marking them with a distinctive seal. The seal's design is usually complicated to avoid counterfeiting, but it can also express something about the institution's history or mission. Dartmouth College is one such chartered body, and it obtained its official seal in 1773.

Design and creation 
Dartmouth College received a royal charter on December 13, 1769 through New Hampshire's colonial governor John Wentworth. The charter required a seal that was to be:

Nevertheless, on March 13, 1770, founder Eleazar Wheelock wrote to the trustees of the English fund that was supporting the College (rather than the American trustees of the institution itself, as the charter stipulated) to suggest that his:

The English trustees, including Lord Dartmouth, did not take up the suggestion. Evidence exists that they were annoyed with Wheelock's acquisition of a charter for a college; they were under the impression that the funds under their control were to be used to support Wheelock's efforts at educating and Christianizing Native Americans at Moor's Indian Charity School at Lebanon, Connecticut. Wheelock then designed a seal for his college bearing a striking resemblance to the seal of the Society for the Propagation of the Gospel, a missionary society founded in London in 1701, in order to maintain the illusion that his college was more for mission work than for higher education. Wheelock arranged for Nathaniel Hurd, a Boston silversmith, to engrave the seal. Hurd had engraved many coats of arms and appears in a John Singleton Copley portrait of ca. 1765 with two books, one of which is A Display of Heraldry by John Guillim (1610). Wheelock wrote to Governor Wentworth on May 22, 1772, saying "I hope that Mr Hurd will have the College Seal compleated by Commencement." The seal (a single-sided "female" die used to form impressions in wax) was ready by Commencement of 1773, and Portsmouth resident and former Chief Justice and Treasurer of the Province of New Hampshire George Jaffrey donated it to the College. The trustees officially accepted the seal on August 25, 1773, describing it as:

History and revisions 

Former College Librarian William Woodward hid the seal from Dartmouth's officers along with the charter and four account books after the state of New Hampshire purported to take over the operation of Dartmouth College (and purported to make Woodward Treasurer of Dartmouth University). The Dartmouth College Case named Woodward as the defendant and technically sought to recover the items that he had hidden. The College's success in the Supreme Court returned the seal to its possession and extinguished the University.

In 1876, the College switched from having its seal impress wax to having it impress paper. This required a second, "male" die to fit under the original. The seal design was also carved in sandstone on the exterior of Rollins Chapel in 1886 (see above) and in wood on the interior of Commons in the Collis Center in 1901 (see right).

On October 28, 1926, the trustees affirmed the charter's reservation of the seal for official corporate documents alone. The College Publications Committee under Ray Nash commissioned typographer W. A. Dwiggins to create a line-drawing version of the seal in 1940 that saw widespread use.

Dwiggins' design was modified during 1957 to change the date from "1770" to "1769," to accord with the date of the College Charter. The trustees commissioned a new set of dies with a date of "1769" to replace the old dies, now badly worn after almost two hundred years of use. The 1957 design continues to be used under trademark number 2305032.

See also 

 Heraldry of Columbia University
 Heraldry of Harvard University

Notes 

Dartmouth College
Dartmouth College, Seal of